WCWB (104.9 FM) is a radio station broadcasting a Classic Country music format. Licensed to Marathon, Wisconsin, United States, the station serves the Wausau-Stevens Point area.

Format history
During most of the '90s, the station carried a variation of Classic rock under names such as "104.9 KQH" and "104.9 K-ROCK". In 2003, the station flipped to Active Rock as "Rock 104-9". The ratings initially were good, however this did not last and the station switched to its current format.

History
The stations' original calls were WIGL. In 1988, the station changed its call sign to WMGU, with an Adult Contemporary format, as "Magic 105" using a format from syndicator Drake-Chenault, and later using a satellite format from Jones Radio. The station went dark in late 1991, and was later purchased by Americus Communications, headed by Rick Muzzy, initially simulcasting WSPO and its talk format. On February 1, 1996, the call letters switched to WKQH. On August 1, 2017, the calls were changed to WCWB to reflect its B-104.9 Moniker.

References

External links
 http://www.muzzybroadcasting.com/home.html

CWB
Radio stations established in 1988
1988 establishments in Wisconsin
Country radio stations in the United States